Shinnecock may refer to:

 Shinnecock Indian Nation, a federally-recognized American Indian tribe in the Town of Southampton, New York
 Shinnecock Reservation, the tribe's reservation
 Mohegan-Pequot language or Shinnecock language, an extinct Algonquian language formerly spoken by the Shinnecock
 Shinnecock Canal, a canal that cuts across the South Fork of Long Island at Hampton Bays, New York
 Shinnecock Inlet, an inlet connecting Shinnecock Bay and the Atlantic Ocean

See also
 Shinnecock Hills, New York, a hamlet in the Town of Southampton, New York
 Shinnecock Hills Golf Club, a golf course in the hamlet
 Shinnecock Hills (LIRR station), was a station of the Long Island Railroad; closed 1932
 Shinnecock Light, a former lighthouse in Hampton Bays, New York; demolished 1948

Language and nationality disambiguation pages